is a 2002 Japanese novel by Shinji Kimoto. It has been adapted into a web manga series and a live-action film.

Live-action film

In 2008, Takashi Miike directed a live-action film based on the novel by Shinji Kimoto.

Cast
 Hayato Ichihara
 Mitsuki Tanimura
 Mayumi Wakamura
 Rio Matsumoto

References

External links
 Official manga website at Flex Comix 
 

2002 Japanese novels
2002 science fiction novels
FlexComix Blood and FlexComix Next manga
2007 manga
Japanese novels adapted into films
Japanese science fiction novels
Shōnen manga
Webcomics in print